Song Weiping, is a Chinese real estate tycoon and billionaire. He is the co-founder and president of Greentown China.

Career

Song was born in Sheng County, Shaoxing, Zhejiang province in 1958. 1982, he graduated from the Department of History, Hangzhou University (current Zhejiang University). 1982-1987, he taught in a party school. 1987, he went to Zhuhai, Guangdong, and worked in a computer company as a secretary.

In 1994, Song returned to Hangzhou, he founded Greentown China, a real estate company, with his wife Xia Yibo (夏一波). China Greentown is a leading real estate company in Zhejiang, Shanghai and Beijing. He also founded the football club, Hangzhou Greentown F.C.

According to Hurun Report's 2013 China Rich List, Song and his wife were ranked No. 212 in China with a net worth of US$1.22 billion.

References

External links
 Song Weiping's profile at Sohu Finance 

1967 births
Living people
Businesspeople from Shaoxing
People from Shengzhou
Billionaires from Zhejiang
Zhejiang University alumni
Hangzhou University alumni
Chinese real estate businesspeople
Chinese football chairmen and investors